The Chili Bowl Midget Nationals is an indoor midget car race that takes place in January on a 1/4 mile dirt oval track at the Tulsa Expo Center in Tulsa, Oklahoma, United States. NASCAR calls it the "biggest Midget race of the year". It is nicknamed the "Super Bowl of midget racing".

History
The inaugural Chili Bowl was organized by Lanny Edwards and partner Emmett Hahn. It was named after a local company who sponsored the first event.

The inaugural 1987 event consisted of 52 midgets competing in the 2-day event. The event now consists of five days of qualifiers for the Saturday night A-main event, with over 341 cars entered for the 2020 race. One fifth of the drivers compete in each qualifying night's event, attempting to qualify for the A-main. Each qualifying night has heat races, dash-type events, and a 25 lap feature. Drivers who finish poorly in their heat event in their qualifying night start deep in final night qualifying events and have to finish high in many events to make the A-main field. A driver who started in the lowest "P" event would have to finish high in P, O, N, M, L, K, J, I, H, G, F, E, D, C, and B events to reach the A-main. The top two finishers in the qualifying night's feature event plus the top seven finishers the two Saturday night B-main events progress into the Saturday 55-lap A feature field between 24 to 26 cars.

The event also has rewards for winning.  The winner of the second-night Race of Champions between past Chili Bowl winning drivers, drivers nominated by former race champion teams, and the reigning national Midget Driver of the Year will be awarded a guaranteed starting position.  If the driver who won the preceding year's Chili Bowl or the Race of Champions fail to qualify, they are added as the 25th and 26th cars in the field.

The National Midget Auto Racing Hall of Fame uses the event to induct its next class of members.

Originally, the event was held in the week ending on the second Saturday of January. Since 2009, the event usually ends on the third Saturday of January.

Facility

The event is held at the Tulsa Expo Center, the home of The Golden Driller. It accommodates hundreds of race cars, bleachers for 15,000 fans, and a trade show, all under one roof.

The clay which once covered the adjacent fairgrounds is used for the event. The quarter mile indoor track is not affected by adverse weather or drying from the wind or sun.

Drivers
Drivers in other series who come from a midget car background frequently race in the event. The 2007 competitors included NASCAR drivers Tony Stewart, Justin Allgaier, J. J. Yeley, A. J. Fike, Josh Wise, Kasey Kahne, and Jason Leffler, World of Outlaws sprint car drivers Terry McCarl, Tim McCreadie, Danny Lasoski, and Sammy Swindell, NHRA drag racing champions Cruz Pedregon and Gary Scelzi, IndyCar drivers A. J. Foyt IV, Tom Bigelow and Billy Boat, and numerous USAC racers. Drivers in 2008 came from 29 American states, Canada, and Australia.

NASCAR driver Tony Stewart, a two-time winner of the event, said, This is the only place that you can take the best Midget drivers from USAC and Badger [Midget Auto Racing Association], and guys in the Rocky Mountain Midget Association, guys from USAC Sprint Cars and Silver Crown Cars and the World of Outlaws, all the best in dirt open-wheel racing. Those drivers are all at one place for the weekend, and when you've got [all those] guys competing for just the 24 starting spots in the A-Main, you have some of the best racing that you're going to see all year all in one week at the Chili Bowl.

USAC Triple Crown winner Dave Darland said, "You've got guys from all over the world. New Zealand, Australia, NASCAR, NHRA, Indy Cars -- you know, there's just all sorts of different competition there, all sorts of different levels of drivers."

List of A-Main Winners

The A-Main feature was originally a 50-lap main event.  In 2012, following a family domestic violence incident that killed driver Donnie Ray Crawford III, who was participating in the event and was leaving for the venue to participate in Saturday's races when the incident occurred, and was to have attended the University of Oklahoma the next week, the race was expanded to 55 laps (his car number). Drivers with multiple wins include five-time winner Sammy Swindell, Sammy's son Kevin Swindell with four wins, three-time winner Christopher Bell, and two-time winners Dan Boorse, Tony Stewart, Cory Kruseman, Rico Abreu and Kyle Larson.
 The winning driver wins a trophy dubbed the "Golden Driller" after the  statue outside the building.

1987	Rich Vogler
1988	Scott Hatton
1989	Sammy Swindell
1990	Johnny Heydenreich
1991	Lealand McSpadden
1992	Sammy Swindell (2)
1993	Dave Blaney
1994	Andy Hillenburg
1995	Donnie Beechler
1996	Sammy Swindell (3)
1997	Billy Boat
1998	Sammy Swindell (4)
1999	Dan Boorse
2000	Cory Kruseman
2001	Jay Drake
2002	Tony Stewart
2003	Dan Boorse (2) 
2004	Cory Kruseman (2)
2005	Tracy Hines
2006	Tim McCreadie
2007	Tony Stewart (2) 
2008	Damion Gardner
2009	Sammy Swindell (5)
2010	Kevin Swindell
2011   Kevin Swindell (2)
2012   Kevin Swindell (first 55 lap race) (3)
2013   Kevin Swindell (4)
2014   Bryan Clauson
2015   Rico Abreu
2016   Rico Abreu (2)
2017	Christopher Bell
2018   Christopher Bell (2)
2019   Christopher Bell (3)
2020   Kyle Larson
2021   Kyle Larson (2)
2022   Tanner Thorson
2023 Logan Seavey

References

External links

American open wheel series races
Midget car racing
Motorsport in Oklahoma
Sports in Tulsa, Oklahoma
Tulsa State Fair